Mount DeBreuck is the northernmost massif in the Queen Fabiola Mountains. It was discovered on October 7, 1960, by the Belgian Antarctic Expedition under Guido Derom, who named it for William DeBreuck, a glaciologist and observer aboard Belgian aircraft during reconnoitering flights in this area.

References

Mountains of Queen Maud Land
Prince Harald Coast